Billiers is a commune in the Morbihan department of Brittany in northwestern France.

Population
Inhabitants of Billiers are called in French Billiotins.

See also
Communes of the Morbihan department

References

External links
Official site 

Mayors of Morbihan Association 

Communes of Morbihan